The 2011–12 Armenian Cup was the 21st season of Armenia's football knockout competition. It featured the eight 2012 Premier League teams. The tournament began on 19 November 2011. Mika were the defending champions. The winners entered the first qualifying round of the 2012–13 UEFA Europa League.

Results

Quarter-finals
All eight Premier League clubs competed in this round. The first legs were played on 19 and 20 November 2011, with the second legs were played on 23 and 24 November 2011.

|}

Semi-finals
The four winners from the quarterfinals entered this round. The first legs were played on 17 March 2012, with the second legs were played on 11 April 2012.

|}

Final

References

External links

 2012 Cup draw
 Armenia Cup 2012 at Soccerway.com

Armenian Cup seasons
Armenian Cup
Cup